Christian Gottlieb Welté (3 December 1745/49 – 17 December 1792) was an etcher and landscape painter from Mainz, Germany.

His works, accomplished mostly in small format, represent rococo and transition to early classicism. In Estonia, he painted figural staffages on large Põltsamaa landscapes and depicted Estonian peasants in the 1780s; in Mainz and Frankfurt-am-Main he was known mostly as an etcher and a landscapist. Welté was a typical artist of the Enlightenment – pensive, developing and nonconformist.

He worked in Estonia in the late 18th century at the Põltsamaa Castle and Põltsamaa porcelain manufacture (1781-1784), then as a homeschool teacher in the Võisiku manor (1785-1788) and spent his last years at the Lohu manor in the present-day Kohila Parish, Rapla County, where he died in 1792.

His most important work, the illusionist fresco wall paintings in the hall of the Lohu manor covering 27,6 m2, were discovered in the 1960s under the Grisaille pictorial fresco wall papers on the theme of Don Quixote, printed by  "Jacquemart & Bénard" in Paris, France.

References

External links

Anne Untera: Undeservedly forgotten talent, Estonian Art 2/07 (21), ISSN 1406-5711 (Online) 
Gottlieb Welté at galleries and auctions worldwide
Lohu Manor
Põltsamaa Manor (Castle)

1745 births
1792 deaths
18th-century German painters
18th-century German male artists
German male painters
Rococo painters
Baltic-German people
German etchers
Estonian painters
18th-century Estonian people